This is a list of vertical-lift bridges.

Australia 

 Ryde Bridge – road – Ryde, New South Wales – opened 1935, still used by road traffic but no longer lifts
 Hexham Bridge – road – Hexham, New South Wales – opened 1952
 Harwood Bridge – road – Harwood Island, New South Wales – opened 1966
 Bridgewater Bridge – road & rail – Bridgewater, Tasmania – opened 1946
 Clyde River Bridge – road – Batemans Bay, New South Wales – opened 1956
 Hobart Bridge – road – Hobart, Tasmania – opened 1943, closed 1964 and demolished afterwards
 Paringa Bridge - road - Paringa, South Australia - opened 1927
 Abbotsford Bridge - road - Curlwaa, New South Wales and Yelta, Victoria- opened 1928

Belgium 
 BudabrugNL – road – zeekanaal Brussel-Schelde – opened 1955
 EuropabrugNL – road – zeekanaal Brussel-Schelde – opened 1972
 VerbrandebrugNL – road – zeekanaal Brussel-Schelde – opened 1968
 HumbeekbrugNL – road – zeekanaal Brussel-Willebroek – opened 1968
 BrielenbrugNL – road – zeekanaal Brussel-Schelde – opened 1968
 RingbrugNL – road – zeekanaal Brussel-Willebroek – opened 1986
 VredesbrugNL – road – zeekanaal Brussel-Schelde – opened 1952

Brazil 
 Guaíba Bridge - road - Porto Alegre, Rio Grande do Sul - opened 1958

Canada 
 Bridges 5 (Glendale Avenue Bridge), 11 (Allanburg Bridge) and 21 (Clarence Street Bridge) on the Welland Canal, all built during the late 1920s as part of the Fourth Canal expansion project (1913–1932).  In addition, there are also Bridges 13 (Main Street Bridge), 17 (Dain City Railway Bridge) and 18 (Forks Road Bridge) on the Welland Recreational Waterway (a former channel of the Welland Canal).  However, these bridges have not been operational since 1973.  Bridges 13 and 18 have had their counterweights removed while the machinery for Bridge 17 has been dismantled.  In addition, Bridge 18 no longer possesses its towers; they were removed for ease of maintenance.
 Burlington Canal Lift Bridge, over the Burlington Canal, Burlington, Ontario.  Information is available from  Built 1962.
 Pretoria Bridge over the Rideau Canal in Ottawa, Ontario
 Selkirk Lift Bridge over the Red River in Selkirk, Manitoba
 Victoria Bridge over the Saint Lawrence River connecting Saint-Lambert and Montreal, Quebec.
 Second Narrows Bridge Vancouver, BC over Burrard Inlet (rail bridge).
 Okanagan Lake Bridge in Kelowna, BC across Okanagan Lake – replaced in 2008.
 Shippagan Bridge Shippagan, NB over Shippagan Bay.
 Sir Ambrose Shea Bridge, Placentia, NL. Built 1961.

China 

 , across Hai River in Tianjin
 , across Pearl River in Guangzhou

France 

 Pont Gustave-Flaubert – crossing the Seine at Rouen, this lift bridge is the highest vertical-lift bridge in Europe, allowing ships up to 55 m tall to pass under it. It is 670 m long, with a span of 116 metres. A striking design feature, the two road sections are mounted outside the central towers. The bridge was designed by François Gillard and Aymeric Zublena and opened to road traffic on 25 September 2008. It is named after the author Gustave Flaubert who was born in Rouen.
 Pont de Recouvrance – over the river Penfeld in Brest – road & tramway
 Pont Levant de CriméeFR – over the Ourcq Canal; the last surviving vertical-lift bridge in Paris
 The Pont Jacques Chaban-Delmas, spanning the River Garonne in Bordeaux, was opened in March 2013. The central lift span is 117m long and can be lifted vertically up to 53m to let tall ships pass underneath. The bridge is 575m long with the central lift span weighing around 2,600 tonnes. Its width varies from 32 to 45m and it will be used by cars, trams, cyclists and pedestrians. It can handle 43,000 vehicles a day and will reduce traffic congestion in Bordeaux. Structurae gives a length of 110 m for the lift span, making it probably the longest vertical-lift span in Europe.

Germany 

  in Hamburg, from 1934, demolished in 2018
 Karnin Lift Bridge, Mecklenburg-Vorpommern
 , a pair of vertical-lift bridges in Hamburg, have a lift span 100 m long, one of the longest in Europe It's opened in a regular schedule every two hours.

Indonesia 
 Ampera Bridge – an automobile lift bridge located in Palembang that cross the Musi River. This bridge is still used by road vehicles but since 1970 never lift its road deck again. Eventually its counterweights removed in 1990.

Italy 

 Ponte Due GiugnoES – road – Fiumicino, Rome– rebuilt in 1945

Japan 
 Chikugo River Lift Bridge – connecting Ōkawa, Fukuoka and Saga, Saga. Constructed as a railway bridge in 1935, it is 507 m long, with a central span 24 m long that weighs 48 t and rises 23 m. The railway closed in 1987, but the bridge reopened to pedestrians in 1996 and was designated an important cultural property in 2003.

The Netherlands 
 Rotterdam - De Hef (The Lift), designed by Pieter Joosting, opened October 31, 1927
 Gouwe – three identical lift bridges crossing the Gouwe river at Alphen aan den Rijn, Boskoop and Waddinxveen, built in 1930.
 Botlek BridgeNL – in Rotterdam

Romania/Bulgaria 
 Danube Bridge, connecting both countries over Danube, between Giurgiu and Russe. Opened on 20 June 1954, the bridge is 2,223.52 m (7,295.0 ft) long and has a central lift-bridge (85 m) to allow the free-passing oversized boats passage.

Russia 
 Finland Railway Bridge, in Saint-Petersburg
 , in Rostov-on-Don
 The two-storey bridge Reichsbahnbrücke https://de.wikipedia.org/wiki/K%C3%B6nigsberger_Pregelbr%C3%BCcken#Reichsbahnbr%C3%BCcke in Kaliningrad

Sweden 
 E4 motorway bridge at Södertälje, southwest of Stockholm.

Ukraine 
 Bridge over the mouth of Dniester in Zatoka, built in 1953-1955.
 The , over the Dnieper River in Kremenchuk, built in 1949

United Kingdom 
 Leamington Lift Bridge – in Edinburgh crossing the Union Canal. Built in 1906.
 Kingsferry Bridge – built in Kent in 1960.
 Turnbridge Lift Bridge – highly unusual bridge at Turnbridge in Huddersfield.
 Salford Quays lift bridge – carries pedestrians across the Manchester Ship Canal.
 Tees Newport Bridge – 82m span, first major lift bridge in the UK, built in 1934, still used by road traffic but no longer lifts since 1990.
 Salford Centenary Bridge – road bridge across the Manchester Ship Canal, opened in December 1994.
 Deptford Creek Lifting Bridge –  rail bridge, in regular use, but no longer lifts on London and Greenwich Railway.

United States 

 Adam Street Lift Bridge – A two-lane vehicle and pedestrian bridge spanning the Erie Canal in Lockport, New York. Built in 1917, it has a span of 130 ft (40 m). It was closed in 2011 and left in the raised position.
 Adams Basin Lift Bridge, also called the Washington Street Lift Bridge, in Adams Basin, New York – A two-lane vehicle and pedestrian bridge spanning the Erie Canal near Spencerport, New York. Built in 1912, it has a span of 145 ft (44 m).
 Aerial Lift Bridge – An automobile bridge in Duluth, Minnesota which began life as an aerial transfer or ferry bridge.
 Arthur Kill Vertical Lift Bridge – Connecting Elizabeth, New Jersey, and Staten Island, New York; with a lift with a  span: the longest lift span in the world.
 ASB Bridge – A two-deck bridge over the Missouri River in Kansas City, Missouri. From 1911–87, handled both trains and cars, on separate decks, and still carries railroad traffic.
Bridge 710 – A single-track railroad bridge over the Calumet River in Chicago that served U.S. Steel's South Works. Formerly owned by EJ&E and now owned by Canadian National since their purchase of EJ&E.
 Broadway Bridge – A bridge spanning the Harlem River and carrying both road traffic and trains of the New York City Subway's no. 1 line.
 Burlington-Bristol Bridge – A two-lane bridge over the Delaware River, joining Bristol, Pennsylvania with Burlington, New Jersey near Philadelphia
 The BNSF Railroad Bridge across the Willamette River, in Portland, Oregon.
 Canal Street railroad bridge – Chicago, IL 1914
 Cape Cod Canal Railroad Bridge – A single-track railroad bridge over the Cape Cod Canal in Bourne, Massachusetts.

 Cape Fear Memorial Bridge – A four-lane bridge over the Cape Fear River that joins Wilmington and Brunswick County, North Carolina.
 Carlton Bridge –  Road and single-track rail bridge in Bath, Maine built in 1927, repaired 1976. Road was bypassed in 2000 with new Route 1 bridge, now only used by the Rockland Branch railroad. Crosses the Kennebec River near Bath Iron Works.
 Chelsea Street Bridge – A four-lane bridge over the Chelsea Creek, opened in 2012, that joins East Boston, and Chelsea, Massachusetts.
 Chesapeake & Delaware Canal Lift Bridge – A single-track railroad bridge over the Chesapeake and Delaware Canal in Delaware that was built in 1966 for the Pennsylvania Railroad and replaced an earlier structure when the U.S. Army Corps of Engineers widened the canal in the mid-1960s.  It is the only bridge of its type along the canal, with earlier highway lift or swing bridges being replaced by high-level crossings.
 Claiborne Avenue Bridge – A four-lane bridge over the Industrial Canal carrying LA 39 in New Orleans.
 Commodore Schuyler F. Heim Bridge (roadway bridge) and the directly adjacent Henry Ford Bridge (railroad bridge), at the Port of Los Angeles
 Conrail Bridge – A single-track railroad bridge over the mouth of the Cuyahoga River in Cleveland, one of nine railroad and automobile lift bridges, and three bascule bridges, allowing ore boats to service the Flats.
 Danziger Bridge – The world's widest vertical-lift movable bridge, at seven lanes, over the Industrial Canal in New Orleans.
 Delair Bridge – A two-track rail bridge carrying New Jersey Transit Atlantic City Line passenger trains and Conrail freight trains over the Delaware River. Bridge built 1896; lift span inserted in 1960 over a relocated and widened shipping channel to replace the original swing span which was immobilized.
 Dock Bridge – A six-track rail bridge in New Jersey carrying Amtrak, New Jersey Transit and PATH trains over the Passaic River. Consists of three parallel vertical lift spans carrying one, two and three tracks respectively from south to north, with both tracks of the two-track span at a higher level than all the others.
 Eagle Harbor Lift Bridge – A two-lane vehicle and pedestrian bridge spanning the Erie Canal near Albion, New York. Built in 1910, it has a span of 145 ft (44 m).
 Exchange Street Lift Bridge – A two-lane vehicle and pedestrian bridge spanning the Erie Canal in Lockport, New York. Built in 1915, it has a span of 133 ft (41 m).
 Fairport Lift Bridge, also called the Main Street Lift Bridge – A two-lane vehicle and pedestrian bridge spanning the Erie Canal in Fairport, New York. Built in 1914 and notable in design due to its irregular, ten-sided structure as well as the 32-degree angle at which it crosses the canal. The bridge has a span of 139 ft (42 m).
 Florence Bridge – A bridge that carries Illinois Route 100 and Illinois Route 106 across the Illinois River just east of Florence, Illinois.
 Fore River Bridge – Proposed replacement bridge for Route 3A over Fore River in Quincy and Weymouth, Massachusetts Opens 2015.
 Fourteenth Street Bridge (Ohio River) – A single-track railroad bridge over the Ohio River at its widest point, Louisville, Kentucky.
 Fruitvale Bridge - a vertical-lift Warren through truss railroad that connects the cities of Oakland and Alameda in California. Unused since 2000.
 Gasport Lift Bridge, also called the Hartland Road Lift Bridge – A two-lane vehicle and pedestrian bridge spanning the Erie Canal in Gasport, New York. Built in 1913, it has a span of 139 ft (42 m).
 Green Island Bridge – Opened in 1981, its span is a simply supported plate girder bridge supported by a cross member.
 Harry S. Truman Bridge – Opened in 1945, a single-track railroad bridge over the Missouri River, in Kansas City, Missouri.
 Hastings Rail Bridge – A single-track railroad bridge at Hastings, Minnesota over the Mississippi River.
 Hawthorne Bridge – A four-lane bridge over the Willamette River in Portland, Oregon.  Opened in 1910, it is the oldest operating vertical-lift bridge in the United States.
 Helen Madere Memorial Bridge, called the "Rio Vista bridge" locally, which carries SR12 across the Sacramento River in Rio Vista, California.
 Hood River Bridge – over the Columbia River, connecting Hood River, Oregon, with White Salmon, Washington
 

 Holley Lift Bridge, also called the East Avenue Lift Bridge, in Holley, New York – A two-lane vehicle and pedestrian bridge spanning the Erie Canal in Holley, New York. Built in 1911, it has a span of 141 ft (43 m).
 Hulberton Road Lift Bridge – A two-lane vehicle and pedestrian bridge spanning the Erie Canal in Hulberton, New York. Built in 1913, it has a span of 145 ft (44 m).
 Ingersoll Street Lift Bridge – A two-lane vehicle and pedestrian bridge spanning the Erie Canal in Albion, New York. Built in 1911, it has a span of 135 ft (41 m).
 Interstate Bridge – Carries Interstate 5 traffic over the Columbia River between Vancouver, Washington, and Portland, Oregon.
 James River Bridge – A four-lane vehicle bridge crossing the James River in Virginia. It connects Isle of Wight County to Newport News, Virginia. Originally built in 1928, before being replaced between 1975 and 1982, it has a span of 415 ft (126.5 m).
 Joe Page Bridge – Along the Great River Road and Illinois Route 100, it connects Greene County, Illinois at Hardin, Illinois to Calhoun County, Illinois over the Illinois River, and has a lift span of 308 feet 9 inches long.
 Knowlesville Lift Bridge – A two-lane vehicle and pedestrian bridge spanning the Erie Canal [[Ridgeway, New Yorknear Medina, New York. Built in 1910, it has a span of 145 ft (44 m).
 Lehigh Valley Railroad Bridge – Over Newark Bay, used by freight rail within Conrail's North Jersey Shared Assets Area
 Main Street Bridge – A four-lane bridge over the St. Johns River in downtown Jacksonville, Florida.
 Main Street Lift Bridge (Albion, New York) – A two-lane vehicle and pedestrian bridge spanning the Erie Canal in Albion, New York. Built in 1914, it has a span of 138 ft (42 m).
 Main Street Lift Bridge (Brockport, New York) – A two-lane vehicle and pedestrian bridge spanning the Erie Canal in Brockport, New York. Built in 1915, it has a span of 156 ft (48 m).
 Marine Parkway–Gil Hodges Memorial Bridge – Crosses Rockaway Inlet between Brooklyn and Queens, New York; designed in 1937 by David Steinman.
 Medina Lift Bridge, also called the Prospect Avenue Lift Bridge – A two-lane vehicle and pedestrian bridge spanning the Erie Canal in Medina, New York. Built in 1914, it has a span of 130 ft (40 m).
 Middleport Lift Bridge, also called the Main Street Lift Bridge – A two-lane vehicle and pedestrian bridge spanning the Erie Canal in Middleport, New York. Built in 1915, it has a span of 142 ft (43 m).
 Murray Morgan Bridge – Steel lift bridge in Tacoma, Washington. Notable for its height above water, sloping span and overhead span to carry a water pipe. Closed October 23, 2007.
Naheola Bridge – Built in 1934, a steel lift bridge in Alabama which spans the Tombigbee River, connecting Choctaw and Marengo counties. Notable for the fact that rail and automotive traffic shared the same surface until its closure to automotive traffic in 2001.
 Oregon Trunk Rail Bridge, built in 1912 – crossing the Columbia River and still in use by BNSF freight trains
 Park Avenue Bridge – New York City bridge with twin  spans, which replaced a swing bridge in 1956. Carries all Metro-North lines operating out of Grand Central Terminal.
 Park Avenue Lift Bridge – A two-lane vehicle and pedestrian bridge spanning the Erie Canal in Brockport, New York. Built in 1914, it has a span of 156 ft (48 m).
 Philadelphia Naval Shipyard – A bridge that connects 26th Street with the west-end of the ship yard over a waterway between the Schuylkill River and Reserve Basin.
 Portage Lake Lift Bridge – A bridge which connects the Michigan cities of Hancock and Houghton
 Rio Hondo Bridge – Built in 1953, Texas’ only lift bridge built between 1945 and 1960 still operating. Considered a prime gateway of the Rio Grande Valley, the bridge remains critical to the region’s economy.  Every year, its spans open about 250 times to make room for barges hauling fuel, fertilizer, sand and cement to the Port of Harlingen.
 Sault Ste. Marie International Railroad Bridge – A bridge system with 9 camelback spans, one of which is a lift bridge.
 Sarah Mildred Long Bridge and Memorial Bridge – Two lift bridges (out of 3 bridges) over the Piscataqua River between Portsmouth, New Hampshire and Kittery, Maine.
 Spencerport Lift Bridge, also called the Union Street Lift Bridge – A two-lane vehicle and pedestrian bridge spanning the Erie Canal in Spencerport, New York. Built in 1913, it has a span of 141 ft (43 m).
 Stillwater Lift Bridge – A highway bridge that joins Stillwater, Minnesota with Houlton, Wisconsin over the St. Croix River.
 St. Paul Union Pacific Vertical-lift Rail Bridge – A single-track railroad bridge in downtown St. Paul, Minnesota over the Mississippi River.
 Steel Bridge – A double-lift bridge in Portland, Oregon over the Willamette River. Its lower deck carries railroad tracks and a bike lane and can be lifted independently of the upper deck with a road and light rail tracks.  It is the only double-deck bridge with independent lifts in the world.
 Thames River Bridge (Amtrak) – Two-track rail bridge in New London, Connecticut carrying Amtrak's Northeast Corridor over the Thames River. Built in 1919, a new vertical lift span was erected in place of the original bascule span in 2008.
 Tower Bridge – A four-lane bridge over the Sacramento River connecting Sacramento and West Sacramento, California.
 Torrence Avenue and four railroad bridges along Calumet Shipping Canal in Chicago, Illinois
 Triborough Bridge Manhattan Span – A six-lane bridge connecting the New York City boroughs of Queens and Manhattan, built in 1934.
 William A. Stickel Memorial Bridge – A six-lane bridge that crosses over the Passaic River between Newark and Harrison, New Jersey.
 White Kitchen (West Pearl River) Bridge - Built in 1925. This bridge carries U.S. Highway 90 traffic over The West Pearl River   toward the Louisiana-Mississippi state line
 Yancopin Bridge – A former railroad bridge over the Arkansas River in Arkansas converted to a rail trail. Built in 1903, bridge contains both a lift and a swing span; river channel under lift span now high and dry due to diversion of water through the Arkansas Post Canal.

References